Zoppo di Gangi or the Cripple from the town of Gangi, Sicily may refer to one of two painters:
 or Bazzano (1562-1630)
Giuseppe Salerno (1588-1630), who was Vazzano's pupil and was more prolific